Jama Masjid, Tehseenganj, Husainabad, Lucknow is a mosque located in the area of Lucknow. The construction of this mosque was started in the year 1839 A.D. by Mohammad Ali Shah, third Badshah of Awadh with the intention to surpass the Jama Masjid at Delhi in size, but after his death the mosque was completed by his wife Queen Malika Jahan Sahiba in the year 1845 A.D. Built with "Lakhauri" bricks and plastered with lime, it is decorated with coloured stucco motifs. Standing on a square lofty terrace, it has a rectangular prayer hall, on the west with a magnificent facade of eleven arches. The central one is higher and provided with an unusually high doorway which rises above the roof in a sharply pointed arch decorated in coloured stucco. The prayer hall is surmounted by three pear-shaped high double domes decorated with an inverted lotus on the top and is also flanked by two octagonal four-storeyed tapering minarets on either side, crowned by "Chhatries" on the top.
An Imambara known as Imambara Malika Jahan is also situated at the south of this mosque.

External links 

Mosques in Uttar Pradesh
Buildings and structures in Lucknow
Lucknow